The Ministry of Local Government and Rural Development is the Government of Ghana agency responsible for the promotion of government policies and projects in Ghana. The ministry also promotes governance and balanced rural based development.

The Ministry
The Ministry is headed by the Minister of state appointed by the President of Ghana. The current Head of the ministry is Julius Debrah who took over from Akwasi Oppong Fosu in 2013. Samuel Ofosu-Ampofo and Hon.Joseph Yieleh Chireh (MP) also held same positions in the past.

References

Ministries and Agencies of State of Ghana
Local government ministries
Rural development ministries